Simon Bwalya (born 25 February 1985) is a Zambian international footballer who plays for Kansanshi Dynamos, as a midfielder.

Career
Born in Lusaka, Bwalya has played for Lusaka Dynamos, Power Dynamos and Nkana.

He earned 5 caps for Zambia between 2009 and 2010.

In December 2019, Bwalya joined Kansanshi Dynamos.

References

1985 births
Living people
Zambian footballers
Zambia international footballers
Lusaka Dynamos F.C. players
Power Dynamos F.C. players
Nkana F.C. players
Association football midfielders
Sportspeople from Lusaka
Kansanshi Dynamos F.C. players
Zambia A' international footballers
2009 African Nations Championship players